The Iván Vassilev Todorov Arena is a multi-purpose indoor arena located in Cali, Valle del Cauca, Colombia.

The arena is part of the National Sports School campus. Construction began on 9 February 2013 and ended on 26 June. The arena was inaugurated ahead of the 2013 World Games, at which it hosted the korfball competition. At the 2021 Junior Pan American Games, the Iván Vassilev Todorov Arena was the site of the handball competition. It has also been used for basketball, volleyball and futsal matches.

The Iván Vassilev Todorov Arena has a capacity of 1,600. It is named in honour of Bulgarian coach Iván Vassilev Todorov (d. 2019), grand master of the National Sports School and a key figure in the development of basketball in Colombia.

References

Sport in Cali
Buildings and structures in Cali
Basketball venues in Colombia
Indoor arenas in Colombia
Sports venues completed in 2013
2013 establishments in Colombia